This is a list of public art in Madison, Wisconsin.

This list applies only to works of public art accessible in an outdoor public space. For example, this does not include artwork visible inside a museum.

References

External links

Public art
Public art in Wisconsin
Public art
Madison, Wisconsin
Public art in Madison